Over My Dead Body (lit. "Return of the Corpse") is a 2012 South Korean comic heist film, starring Lee Beom-soo, Ryoo Seung-bum and Kim Ok-bin. The plot centers on a biotech researcher, a woman whose father was murdered, and a man attempting to commit insurance fraud whose lives get tied up in the case of a stolen semiconductor chip and a missing corpse. Released on March 29, 2012, the film sold 985,178 tickets in total.

Plot
Baek Hyun-chul (Lee Beom-soo) is a biotech scientist researching the cure for skin cancer. Deciding to shut the lab and sell Hyun-chul's work overseas, the head of the pharmaceutical conglomerate, Kim Taek-soo, sends Steve Jung and his gang to force the lab to shut down and take the research. Hyun-chul's colleague Han Jin-soo protests the decision, and is later involved in a hit-and-run accident and falls into a vegetative state.
 
Taek-soo is also betrayed and murdered by Steve, little knowing the research is on a microchip planted inside his body. Driven by vengeance, Hyun-chul and Jin-soo's pink-haired daughter Dong-hwa (Kim Ok-bin) plot to steal Taek-soo's body to pay for Jin-soo's hospital bills. However the body they escape from the morgue with isn't Taek-soo's but that of Ahn Jin-oh (Ryoo Seung-bum), a man who faked his death in order to hide from loan sharks. Believing Taek-soo's body has been stolen, Steve and his gang begin a hunt for Hyun-chul and Dong-hwa to recover the precious microchip.

Cast
Lee Beom-soo - Baek Hyun-chul 
Ryoo Seung-bum - Ahn Jin-oh  
Kim Ok-bin - Han Dong-hwa 
Yoo Da-in - NIS agent Jang Ha-yeon
Jung Man-sik - Steve Jung 
Shin Jung-geun - Team leader Jo
Go Chang-seok - Sung-koo 
Oh Jung-se - Myung-kwan 
Bae Jeong-nam  - Jong-moo 
Jung In-gi - Han Jin-soo

Production
When director Woo Seon-ho was at his maternal grandfather's funeral, he wondered what would happen if his grandfather's dead body suddenly disappeared. This unusual and dark thought inspired his debut feature film, Over My Dead Body. He had previously won the comedy award at the 4th Mise-en-scène Short Film Festival for My Really Big Mike.

Over My Dead Body has elements of social satire and black comedy as well as character comedy. At the core of the comedy is various unexpected situations as different characters come together. There are also chase scenes shot around Banpo Bridge and the surrounding high-rise apartment blocks.

References

External links
  
 
 
 

2012 films
2010s crime comedy films
South Korean crime comedy films
CJ Entertainment films
South Korean heist films
2010s heist films
2012 comedy films
2010s South Korean films